James Hoge Tyler III (May 21, 1910 – September 29, 1988) was an American attorney and politician who served as a member of the Virginia Senate. He was the grandson on Governor James Hoge Tyler.

References

External links
 
 

1910 births
1988 deaths
Democratic Party members of the Virginia House of Delegates
Democratic Party Virginia state senators
20th-century American politicians